Sons of Angels are a Norwegian/Swedish Rock Band (William-Olsson is Swedish) from 1990. They released their first self-titled album in 1990 on May 11. They weren't very well known but their first record managed to sell over 150 000 copies. 
They had a bit of success with the album's single and first track - "Cowgirl" - they also made a music video of that song. They returned in 2001 with a 2nd album - "Slumber With The Lion".

Track list
 Cowgirl
 Spend the Night
 Look Out For Love
 Lonely Rose
 Rock And Roll Star
 Trance Dance
 Would You Die For Me?
 Could It Be Love
 Fight
 Fly

Band members
 Hans-Olav Solli - vocals
 Torstein Bieler - bass, backing vocals
 Lars Kilevold - keyboards
 Staffan William-Olsson - guitar
 Geir Digernes - drums

Notes
American / Japanese rock group Crush 40 (the main artists behind well known theme songs to Sonic the Hedgehog video games such as "Open Your Heart" from Sonic Adventure) were originally known as Sons of Angels.
They did release an album entitled "Sons of Angels - Thrill of the Feel" in 2000. The band had to change their name later to Crush 40 due to the fact that there were already another Sons of Angels band in existence.

External links
 Sons of Angels at Amazon.com

Norwegian musical groups